Deepak (दीपक) is a Hindi word meaning lamp, from the Sanskrit source word for light. The name Deepak symbolizes a bright future. In the twentieth century, it became very popular as a first name for male Hindus. Names like Deepa (male—though used for females by many Indians now), Deepika (female), Deepthi (female), Deepam (male), Deepali (female), and many others are related to Deepak.

The names mentioned above are related to light or the holder of light:
 Deepak (male) – a lamp or candle; meaning one who gives light on his own behalf
 Deepa (male) – a lamp
 Deep (male) – wick/flame of the lamp; Hindi/north Indian derivation of Sanskrit "Deepa" (male)
 Deepankar (male) – one who lights lamps
 Deependra (male) – lord of light
 Deepit (male) – lighted
 Deepanjali (female) – offerings of lamps
 Deepmala (female) – garland of lamps, tower of lamps
 Deepali (female) – collection of lamps
 Deepika (female) –  a little light
 Deepamalika (female) – garland of lamps
 Deepunja (male) – light of a lamp
 Deepti/Deepthi (female) –  glow, shine
 Deepanshu (male) – glow

Notable people named Deepak
 Deepak, stage name of Arjan Bajwa, Indian actor
 Deepak Chopra, writer and new age alternative medicine promoter
 Deepak Dinkar, Tamil actor
 Deepak Kumar, historian
 Deepak Mondal, Indian footballer
 Deepak Obhrai, Canadian politician
 Deepak Sharma, Indian television director and producer
 Deepak Thakur, Indian hockey player
 Deepak Tijori, Indian actor and director
 Deepak Tripathi, historian
 Deepak Verma, British-Asian actor
 P. A. Deepak, Indian Mix Engineer and Music Producer

References

Indian masculine given names